A Night In Rivendell is the second album by the Danish group the Tolkien Ensemble. It features songs composed to the lyrics found in J. R. R. Tolkien's the Lord of the Rings and forms the second part of what was to become a complete musical interpretation of all lyrics in the book.

Track listing 

"A Rhyme of Lore" (Caspar Reiff) – 2.03
"Gandalf's Song of Lórien" (Caspar Reiff) – 3.13
"Lament of the Rohirrim" (Caspar Reiff) – 3.05
"Frodo's Lament for Gandalf" (Peter Hall) – 5.46
"Bilbo's Song" (Caspar Reiff) – 3.59
"Gollums Song/Riddle" (Caspar Reiff) – 3.46
"Lament for Boromir" (Caspar Reiff) – 8.23
"Song in the Woods" (Peter Hall) – 1.44
"The Fall of Gil-galad" (Peter Hall) – 3.38
"Lament for Théoden" (Caspar Reiff) – 9.34
"Song of the Mounds of Mundborg" (Caspar Reiff) – 5.55
"Elven Hymn to Elbereth Gilthoniel, A Elbereth Gilthoniel..." (Caspar Reiff) – 2.09

Credits

 Peter Hall – vocal, guitar, mandolin, Penny-whistle, Frodo and Sam
  - guitar
 Morten Ryelund Sørensen - violin
  - Accordion
 Morten Ernst Lassen – Aragorn
 Signe Asmussen – voice of Rivendell and Galadriel
 Mads Thiemann – Bilbo
 Ulrik Cold – Gandalf
 Kurt Ravn – Legolas
 Povl Dissing – Gollum
 Gabriella Persson – Bassoon
 Torben H. S. Svendsen – Double-bass
 Kresten Stubbe Teglbjerg – Piano
 Francis Norén – voices
 Morten Kramp – voices
 String quartet: Morten Ryelund, Mette Tjærby, Jørgen Eyvind Hansen and Dorthe Buch-Andersen
 The Chamber Choir Hymnia conducted by Flemming Windekilde

Production

Musical Director: Morten Ryelund Sørensen
Producers: Caspar Reiff, Peter Hall and Morten Ryelund Sørensen
Engineering: Hans Nielsen and Viggo Mangor
Cover Illustration: Queen Margrethe II of Denmark
Cover Design: Dan Eggers and Connie B. Berentzen

References

2000 albums
The Tolkien Ensemble albums
Concept albums